Kabanda is a surname. Notable people with the surname include:

Bernard Kabanda (1959–1999), Ugandan guitarist
Elizabeth Kabanda, Ugandan lawyer and judge
Ibrahim Kironde Kabanda, Ugandan businessman and entrepreneur
Mary Babirye Kabanda (born 1971), Ugandan politician and teacher